Mark Childress (born 1957 in Monroeville, Alabama) is an American novelist and Southern writer.

Life
Childress grew up in Ohio, Indiana, Mississippi, and Louisiana. He graduated from the University of Alabama, where he was a member of the Mallet Assembly. In 1978 Childress was a reporter for The Birmingham News, Features Editor of Southern Living magazine, and Regional Editor of The Atlanta Journal-Constitution.

He was formerly a resident of Dallas and New York, and lives in Key West, Florida .

Articles and reviews by Childress have appeared in The New York Times, Los Angeles Times, The Times, San Francisco Chronicle, the Saturday Review, the Chicago Tribune, The Philadelphia Inquirer, Travel and Leisure, and other national and international publications.

He has also written three picture books for children: Joshua and Bigtooth, Joshua and the Big Bad Blue Crabs, and Henry Bobbity Is Missing And It Is All Billy Bobbity's Fault.

Childress wrote the screenplay for the film Crazy in Alabama.

Honors
Childress received the Thomas Wolfe Award, the University of Alabama's Distinguished Alumni Award, and the Alabama Library Association's Writer of the Year.

Tender, a Literary Guild and Doubleday Book Club selection, was named to several Ten Best of 1990 lists, and appeared on many national bestseller lists.

Crazy in Alabama was a featured selection of the Literary Guild appeared on many bestseller lists and Ten Best of 1993 lists. Crazy in Alabama was The (London) Spectator's "Book of the Year" for 1993 and a New York Times "Notable Book of the Year", and was on the Der Spiegel bestseller list in Germany for 10 months. The film Crazy in Alabama was an official selection of the Venice and San Sebastian film festivals in 1999.

One Mississippi was a summer reading selection of Good Morning America, O: The Oprah Magazine, People magazine, the Los Angeles Times, and the Wall Street Journal, and was nominated for the Southeastern Independent Booksellers Association's "Book of the Year" award. Stephen King named One Mississippi as #3 on his list of the "Ten Best Books of 2006" in Entertainment Weekly.

Bibliography
 A World Made of Fire
 V for Victor
 Tender
 Crazy in Alabama
 Gone for Good
 One Mississippi
 Georgia Bottoms

References

External links
 Official site
 

1957 births
20th-century American novelists
American reporters and correspondents
Living people
People from Monroeville, Alabama
Writers from New York City
University of Alabama alumni
Novelists from Alabama
21st-century American novelists
American male novelists
American children's writers
The Atlanta Journal-Constitution people
Journalists from Alabama
20th-century American male writers
21st-century American male writers
Novelists from New York (state)
20th-century American non-fiction writers
21st-century American non-fiction writers
American male non-fiction writers
LGBT people from Alabama